Nation Under Siege, also known as Boko Haram, is a 2013 Nollywood film that was directed by Pascal Amanfo and executive produced by Double D.

Synopsis
The film's premise follows counter-terrorist expert who is trying to stop a group of Islamic terrorists that are terrorizing and slaughtering Nigerians.

Cast
Nneka J. Adams
Majid Michel
Mary Uranta
Pascal Amanfo
Zynell Lydia
Seun Akindele
Sam Sunny

Reception
The film received some controversy over Majid Michel, a Ghanaian actor, portraying a Nigerian terrorist, and for its depiction of Islamic terrorism, which resulted in the movie getting banned in Ghana. Film theaters in Nigeria also declined to screen the film for the same reasons and Amanfo had to change the film's name from Boko Haram to Nation Under Siege before releasing it in Nigeria.

References

2013 films
2013 action thriller films
2013 crime thriller films
Boko Haram insurgency
English-language Nigerian films
Films about terrorism in Africa
Films set in Nigeria
Films shot in Nigeria
Nigerian action thriller films
Nigerian crime thriller films
2010s English-language films